Arthur Hoérée (16 April 1897, Brussels – 2 June 1986, Paris) was a Belgian musicologist, critic, conductor and composer.

He studied at the Royal Conservatory of Brussels from 1908 to 1912, then at the Conservatoire de Paris.

He was a lecturer and a professor at the École normale de musique, École de la radio à Montrouge and the Sorbonne University. 

He wrote music reviews in many French periodicals including the prestigious and famous La Revue Musicale of Henry Prunières.

A specialist in French music, Hoérée has transcribed and produced several works by François Couperin, and he has published two monographs on Albert Roussel (Paris, 1938, 1969).

His activities as a composer extend to film and stage music. He often collaborated with Arthur Honegger. He had the composer and organist André Jorrand as student in his course of instrumentation.

Film music 
 1934: Rapt, by Dimitri Kirsanoff
 1937: Liberté by Jean Kemm
 1937: Passeurs d'hommes by René Jayet
 1938: L'Ange que j'ai vendu by Michel Bernheim
 1939: L'Or dans la montagne by Max Haufler
 1939: Musicians of the Sky (Les Musiciens du ciel) by Georges Lacombe
 1942: À la belle frégate by Albert Valentin 
 1942: Huit hommes dans un château by Richard Pottier
 1942: Malaria by Jean Gourguet
 1943: La Main de l'homme by Jean Tedesco and François Ardoin (short film)
 1945: Les Démons de l'aube by Yves Allégret
 1945: Enquête du 58 by Jean Tedesco (short film)
 1946: A Lover's Return (Un revenant) by Christian-Jaque (cast member)
 1950: Arrière-saison by Dimitri Kirsanoff
 1951: Les Hommes de l'acier by Jean Tedesco (short film)
 1956: Une tâche difficile'' by Jean Leduc (short film)

Works 
 1923: Septet (mezzo-Soprano, flute, string quartet and piano), Opus 3

External links 
 Arthur Hoérée on Encyclopédie Larousse
 Arthur Hoérée on Allo Ciné
 Arthur Hoérée on Discogs
 Arthur Honegger, Arthur Hoérée on CAIRN
 Excerpt from "Rapt" (1933) on YouTube

Belgian musicians
1897 births 
1986 deaths
Musicians from Brussels
Belgian film score composers
20th-century Belgian musicians
20th-century composers
Belgian expatriates in France